Patersonia inaequalis, commonly known as unequal bract patersonia, is a species of plant in the iris family Iridaceae and is endemic to a restricted part of the south-west of Western Australia. It is a tufted herb with linear, often twisted leaves and white tepals.

Description
Flowering mainly occurs from August to October.

Taxonomy and naming
Patersonia inaequalis was first described in 1873 by George Bentham in Flora Australiensis, from specimens collected by George Maxwell at Stokes Inlet. The specific epithet (inaequalis) means "unequal", referring to the bracts.

Distribution and habitat
Unequal bract patersonia grows in heath and scrub on the coast of southern Western Australia between Stokes Inlet and Mondrain Island in the Recherche Archipelago.

Conservation status
Patersonia inaequalis is classified as "Priority Two" by the Western Australian Government Department of Biodiversity, Conservation and Attractions, meaning that it is poorly known and from only one or a few locations.

References

inaequalis
Flora of Western Australia
Plants described in 1873
Taxa named by George Bentham